Sam Ryan (born 1994) is an Irish Gaelic footballer who plays for Premier Senior Championship club St Finbarr's and at senior level for the Cork county team. He usually lines out as a right corner-back.

Honours
St Finbarr's
Cork Senior Football Championship (1): 2018

Cork
National Football League Division 3 (1): 2020

References

External link
Sam Ryan profile at the Cork GAA website

1994 births
Living people
Cork inter-county Gaelic footballers
St Finbarr's Gaelic footballers